Serapion  is a given name, a variant of Seraphin.

People called Serapion:
Serapion (3rd-century), neoplatonic philosopher and one of the disciples of Plotinus
Serapion (4th century), author of the Sacramentary of Serapion of Thmuis
Serapion of Alexandria (3rd century BC), Greek physician
Serapion of Algiers (1179–1240), Mercedarian saint
Serapion of Antioch (c. 200 AD), Patriarch of Antioch
Serapion (Coptic bishop of Los Angeles) (b. 1951)
Serapion of Macedonia (d. 195), Martyr
Serapion of Novgorod (d. 1516), Russian archbishop
Serapion the Sindonite, 4th century Egyptian monk
Serapion (strategos), probably negotiated in 48 BC for Caesar with Achillas, strategos of Cyprus in 43 BC, executed in 41 BC
Serapion of Vladimir (13th century), bishop of Vladimir
Serapion the Younger (c. 12th century), physician who wrote The Book of Simple Medicine (in Arabic)
Mara bar Serapion, Syrian stoic
Yahya ibn Sarafyun (9th century), also known as Serapion the Elder or Johannes Serapion, Christian physician who wrote two medical compilations in Syriac

See also
Sarapion (Serapion), ancient port city in present-day south-central Somalia
Saint Serapion (Zurbarán), an oil on canvas painting by the Spanish artist Francisco de Zurbarán.
Serapion Brothers, a literary movement in the early Soviet Union